Comamonas piscis is a Gram-negative, obligately aerobic and non-motile bacterium from the genus Comamonas which has been isolated from the intestine of the fish Sebastes schlegelii.

References

External links
Type strain of Comamonas piscis at BacDive -  the Bacterial Diversity Metadatabase

Comamonadaceae
Bacteria described in 2016